Deep Calleth Upon Deep is the ninth studio album by Norwegian black metal band Satyricon. It was released on 22 September 2017 under Napalm Records.

A music video was made for "To Your Brethren in the Dark", directed by Laban Pheidias. The video (the first from the band in nine years), features American actresses Tonya Cornelisse, Jesse Hotchkiss, Diana Wyenn and Shawn Kathryn Kane.

In January 2018, the album was nominated in Norway for the Spellemann Award for best metal album. However, the winner was E of Enslaved.

Background 
Deep Calleth Upon Deep began to be composed in early 2015. However, in late September/early October of that year Satyricon frontman, Sigurd Wongraven, was diagnosed with a benign brain tumor. Due to this situation, the production process for a new album suffered significant delays, while he underwent months of non-surgical treatment and recovery.

Finally, the album was recorded between March and April 2017 in Oslo Klang, a recording facility in downtown Oslo, Norway, and Armoury Studios in Vancouver, Canada. The disc features guest session musicians such as Anders Odden (Satyricon's live bassist), jazz saxophonist Håkon Kornstad and some members of Oslo Philharmonic, but their contributions are somewhat lower than in other albums of the band.

It was mixed in July by Mike Fraser, who had already worked with Satyricon in Now, Diabolical (2006).

The musical style is very similar to their previous albums, with a tempo mostly slower, structures influenced by post-rock music and an accessible and commercial sound. It has been described as a more "black 'n' roll" direction, instead of the more traditional black metal.

The singular cover art comes from an obscure illustration by recognized Norwegian artist Edvard Munch, drawn in 1898.

Track listing

Personnel

Satyricon 
Satyr: vocals, lead guitar, keyboards
Frost: drums

Session musicians 
Anders Odden: bass, rhythm guitar
Håkon Kornstad: tenor saxophone (track 6), backing vocals (tracks 4 & 5)
Arild Stav: bass clarinet
Hans Josef Grih: cello
Frode Carlsen: contrabassoon
Bjarne Magnus Jensen: violin
Jan Olav Martinsen: French horn
Tom Ottar Andreassen: wind instruments

Production 
Arranged and produced by Satyr
Recorded at Oslo Klang, in a 500 year old storehouse and at the Armoury Studios, Vancouver.
Design – Halvor Bodin
Engineered by – Bjarne Stensli, Erik Ljunggren, French Horn, Jan Olav Martinsen
Front cover illustration – Edvard Munch
Mastered by – George Tanderø
Classical arrangements, mellotron – Kjetil Bjerkestrand
Mixed by – Mike Fraser
Photography – Johan Wildhagen

Charts

References 

2017 albums
Satyricon (band) albums
Napalm Records albums